Lansingburgh High School is a senior high school in Troy, New York, and part of the Lansingburgh Central School District.

It has 790 students in grades 9–12. Students identify mostly as Hispanic; White, non-Hispanic; and Black, non-Hispanic. 1% of the students have limited English proficiency and 45% pay reduced lunch prices. With a student to teacher ratio of 14:1, the school has a rating of 4, the same as the school district.

The Principal is Matthew VanDervoort. The Assistant Principal is William Behrle.

References

http://www.zillow.com/troy-ny/schools/lansingburgh-senior-high-school-52578/

Schools in Troy, New York
Public high schools in New York (state)